Pär Kristian Rådström (29 August, 1925 – 29 August, 1963) was a Swedish writer and journalist. He also wrote popular songs and was a radio personality. His novel, Ärans portar (The Gates of Glory), published in 1954, was his first major success.

Biography
Rådström was the son of the writer Karl Johan Rådström and the younger brother of the mathematician Hans Rådström (1919–1970). He was friends with authors Lars Forssell and Stig Claesson, and the subject of Claesson's book, Om vänskap funnes.

Rådström was married to Annemarie Rådström, a journalist and theater director, and their son is the poet and playwright, Niklas Rådström.

Bibliography
Men inga blommor vissnade (1946)  
Stjärnan under kavajslaget  (1949)
Tiden väntar inte (1952)
Greg Bengtsson & kärleken (1953)
Ärans portar (1954)
Paris – en kärleksroman (1955)
Ballong till månen (1958)
Sommargästerna (1960)
Översten (1961)
Mordet. En sörmländsk herrgårdsroman (1962)Den korta resan (1963)

ScreenplayKvinnan som försvann'' (1949)

References

External links 

 
 
 
 Pär Rådström at The Encyclopedia of Science Fiction

1925 births
1963 deaths
Swedish writers
Journalists from Stockholm
20th-century Swedish journalists